The 1970 season of the World Championship Tennis (WCT) circuit was one of the two rival professional male tennis circuits of 1970. It was organized by World Championship Tennis (WCT).

Tournament schedule

Prize money standings

See also
1970 Grand Prix circuit

Notes

References

External links
 ATP 1970 results archive

World Championship Tennis circuit seasons
World Championship Tennis